Dave Not Coming Back is a Canadian documentary film, directed by Jonah Malak and released in 2020. The film centres on diver Dave Shaw's death while attempting to recover the body of Deon Dreyer from the submerged Boesmansgat cave in 2005, through a mix of camcorder footage from the incident and the personal reflections of his surviving friend Don Shirley.

Synopsis 
On October 28, 2004, two cave divers and long-time friends, Don Shirley and David Shaw, planned a dive at Boesmansgat. Dave went to 280 meters, touched the bottom and started exploring. 
He had just broken 4 records at once:
 Depth on a rebreather
 Depth in a cave on a rebreather
 Depth at altitude on a rebreather
 Depth running a line
While doing so, he found a body that had been lying there for nearly ten years. It was the body of the 20-year old diver Deon Dreyer.

Three months later, the two friends decide to come back and retrieve it. They call Deon Dreyer's parents and ask for their permission. They enroll 8 support rebreather divers, all of whom were close to Don Shirley. Gordon Hiles, a cameraman from Cape Town, was filming all throughout the process - from the preparation on the surface to the operation at the bottom of the cave. The surface marshal was Verna van Schaik, who was holding the women's world record for depth. 
Little did they know that, from that second dive, Dave would not be coming back.

Production 
Principal photography took place in 2017 and 2018, in Komati Springs and in Boesmansgat, South Africa, and in Melbourne, Australia.

Underwater filming  
The production team joined effort with Don Shirley and shot all the underwater scenes on location. Half of the scenes were shot in Don's diving centre, the Komati Springs cave, a multilevel underwater mine, 180-meter deep, with many kilometres of galleries. The other half was shot in Boesmansgat, during Don's 2017 diving expedition. 
Because of the lack of communication underwater, the team would rehearse on the surface for long hours until they memorized the shots and the order in which they would be filmed.

Reception 
Dave Not Coming Back received the Audience Award at both Austin Film Festival and Hamilton Film Festival 2020.
The film premiered on August 17, 2020, as part of the Adventure Film Series, a special summer edition of the Whistler Film Festival. It subsequently premiered commercially in Montreal, Quebec, on September 11, and was screened later the same month at the Sudbury Indie Cinema Co-op in Sudbury, Ontario, before being released commercially to streaming platforms in October 2020.

It was released theatrically in the fall of 2020, despite a semi-lockdown due to the COVID-19 pandemic. It was released online in the United States on November 10, 2020, and in Canada on December 15, 2020.

Awards and honors

References

External links
 

2020 films
2020 documentary films
Canadian documentary films
2020s English-language films
2020s Canadian films
Cave diving
Documentary films about underwater diving